Father of Victory is the fourth studio album by the international folk metal project Folkearth, released in December. Its name comes from an epitaph of Odin (Father of Victory).

Track listing

 "The Forlorn Knight" – 3:34
 "The Purest Breed" – 4:26
 "Sleipnir" – 4:42
 "What Glory Remains" – 3:57
 "Dawn in Tir na N' Og" – 4:07
 "The Will of Odin" – 5:50
 "Father of Victory" – 3:08
 "Charles Martel" – 5:17
 "Wallachian Warlord" – 4:28
 "The Iron Wolf" – 4:12
 "Heroes in the Sky" – 4:01
 "Carmina Bellica" – 3:32

References
Father of Victory @ Encyclopaedia Metallum retrieved 11-21-07

2008 albums
Folkearth albums